Eino Saarnikko (28 February 1908 – 12 August 1971) was a Finnish sports shooter. He competed in the 50 m pistol event at the 1948 Summer Olympics.

References

External links
 

1908 births
1971 deaths
Finnish male sport shooters
Olympic shooters of Finland
Shooters at the 1948 Summer Olympics
Sportspeople from Vyborg